Garden of the Righteous may refer to one of the following:

 An inexact translation of Riyad-us Saliheen
 Garden of the Righteous Among the Nations, a garden in Yad Vashem commemorating the Righteous Among the Nations. 
 Garden of the Righteous in Warsaw